Ricciardo e Zoraide (Ricciardo and Zoraide) is an opera in two acts by Gioachino Rossini to an Italian libretto by Francesco Berio di Salsa. The text is based on cantos XIV and XV of Il Ricciardetto, an epic poem by Niccolò Forteguerri.

Performance history
Ricciardo e Zoraide was first performed at the Teatro San Carlo, Naples, on 3 December 1818. It continued to be performed until 1846 but fell out of favor afterwards and was not performed in public again until its revival at the Pesaro  Rossini Opera Festival in 1990. The Rossini Opera Festival featured a new production of the opera in 2018. Among other performances, the opera received a production at the Rossini in Wildbad festival in 2013.

Roles

Synopsis
Place: the city of Dongola in ancient Nubia.
Time: The time of the Crusades

The Nubian King Agorante, who is infatuated with Zoraide, has defeated her father, Ircano and captured her. Ricciardo, a Christian knight and Zoraide's lover, accompanies an emissary to plead for her release. Agorante's jealous wife, Zomira, arranges the  capture of Ricciardo as well and plots to have the young lovers executed to protect her position as Queen. The opera ends with an army of Christian knights rescuing Ricciardo and Zoraide. Ricciardo spares Agorante's life.

Recordings

References
Notes

Sources

Farr, Robert, Recording review: Ricciardo e Zoraide, Opera Rara, Music Web International.
Gossett, Philip; Brauner, Patricia (2001), "Ricciardo e Zoraide" in Holden, Amanda (ed.), The New Penguin Opera Guide, New York: Penguin Putnam. 
Osborne, Charles (1994), The Bel Canto Operas of Rossini, Donizetti, and Bellini, London: Methuen; Portland, Oregon: Amadeus Press.  
Osborne, Richard (1990), Rossini, Ithaca, New York: Northeastern University Press. 
Osborne, Richard (1998), Ricciardo e Zoraide, in  Stanley Sadie, (Ed.), The New Grove Dictionary of Opera, Vol. Three, p. 1312. London: Macmillan Publishers, Inc.   
Osborne, Richard (2018), Recording review: Rossini Ricciardo e Zoraide, Gramophone (magazine).
Servadio, Gaia (2003),  Rossini,  New York: Carroll & Graf Publishers, 2003. 
Steen, Michael and Richard Osborne,  The Lives and Times of the Great Composers: His Life and Works, Oxford University Press, 2007, pp. 271–278. 
Toye, Francis (re-issue 1987), Rossini: The Man and His Music, Dover Publications, 1987.

External links
 Libretto in Italian  Retrieved 13 December 2012

Operas by Gioachino Rossini
Italian-language operas
Operas
Opera world premieres at the Teatro San Carlo
Operas set in Africa